Griže is a village on the right bank of the Savinja River in the Municipality of Žalec in east-central Slovenia. The area is part of the traditional region of Styria. The municipality is now included in the Savinja Statistical Region.

Church
The parish church in the settlement is dedicated to Saint Pancras and belongs to the Roman Catholic Diocese of Celje. It was a Gothic building from the late 15th century that was rebuilt in 1883.

Notable people
Notable people that were born or lived in Griže include:
Janez Goličnik (1737–1807), beekeeper

References

External links

Griže at Geopedia

Populated places in the Municipality of Žalec